Syria is an unincorporated community in Paoli Township, Orange County, in the U.S. state of Indiana.

History
A post office was established at Syria in 1880, and remained in operation until 1904. The community probably took its name from Syria, in Western Asia.

Geography

References

Unincorporated communities in Orange County, Indiana
Unincorporated communities in Indiana